Mark Wyatt may refer to:

 Mark Wyatt (rugby union, born 1961) (born 1961) Bermudan-born Canadian rugby union player
 Mark Wyatt (rugby union, born 1957) (born 1957) Welsh rugby union player
 F. Mark Wyatt (1920–2006), CIA agent